UN Youth New Zealand (formerly the United Nations Youth Association of New Zealand or UNYANZ) is a non-governmental organisation and a registered charity.  Its members are all aged 25 or under or are full-time tertiary students. It is the largest youth-for-youth organisation in New Zealand. Annually, over 3,000 young New Zealanders engage with a UN Youth event. 

UN Youth's stated mission is 'to inspire young people to be engaged global citizens.  It attempts to achieve this mission by hosting international tours, national conferences and regional events for secondary and tertiary students.  

UN Youth is the youth arm of the United Nations Association of New Zealand (UNANZ), who is a member of the World Federation of United Nations Associations (WFUNA).

 Events 

 International Tours 
UN Youth's National Executive appoints tertiary student volunteers as Directors who organise and run five international tours. Delegations often visit United Nations Departments, Embassies, Universities, Non-Governmental Organisations, businesses and other organisations. 

UN Youth runs three tours for secondary students. 

 Global Development Tour: This tour travels around Europe and New York. The focus is on learning about the Sustainable Development Goals. 
 Pacific Leadership Tour: This tour travels to Australia and Samoa or Vanuatu.
 Evatt Competition: This tour travels to Australia and the delegation competes in UN Youth Australia's Evatt Competition. 

UN Youth runs two tours for tertiary students. 

 North American Leadership Tour: This tour travels around the United States and Mexico. 
 Globalisation Tour: This tour travels to China and around Southeast Asia. 

 National Conferences 
UN Youth's National Executive appoints tertiary student volunteers as National Committee Members who organise and run three national events. Events often involve educational committee sessions, engaging workshops and social events. 

UN Youth's three national events are for secondary students. Each national event attracts between 150 - 300 students. 

 Aotearoa Youth Declaration: This four-day event is held in April in Auckland. Participants are placed in policy focus groups. Participants will learn about existing policies and then make recommendations for decision-makers such as the New Zealand Government, local council bodies and ministries. All the recommendations are compiled into a document called a 'Declaration'.
 New Zealand Model United Nations: This four-day event is held in July in Wellington at the Victoria University of Wellington. Participants are delegates representing an allocated member state of the United Nations. Delegates will debate pressing global issues such as nuclear disarmament, climate change and urbanisation. 
 New Zealand Model Parliament:' This three-day event is held in September in Canterbury at the University of Canterbury. Participants are Members of Parliament representing a party of the New Zealand Parliament. Participants will debate a mock bill on a pressing domestic issue.

Regional Events 
UN Youth's Regional Councils appoint tertiary student volunteers as Regional Committee Members who organise and run various regional events. 

Additionally, Regional Councils work with High School Ambassadors to promote UN Youth.

Structure 
UN Youth has a Board of Directors and National Executive who led the organisation. Additionally, they have an Extended Leadership Group consisting of the National Executive members, National Conference Coordinators and Regional Council Presidents.

Board of Directors 
The board of directors is the highest authority and policy-making body within the organisation. Their primary obligation is ensuring the organisation has a sustainable long-term strategy in achieving their mission. This includes monitoring financial performance, performing risk assessments and reviewing organisational policies. 

The Board of Directors comprises some Ordinary Directors, some Independent Directors, the National President and a Volunteers' Representative. The Board of Directors' administrative responsibilities are carried out by a Board Secretary. The Board of Directors meets virtually at least once every six weeks. Additionally, they have an Appointments Committee; Financial, Risk and Audit Committee; and Policy, Impact and Culture Committee who meet regularly.

National Executive 
The National Executive manages day-to-day functions and oversees all operations of the organisation. Their primary obligation is ensuring the organisation is functioning efficiently and they are accountable to the Board of Directors. This includes overseeing three National Committees and four Regional Councils. 

The National Executive compromises the National President, National Communications Officer, National Education Officer, National Finance Officer, National Information Officer, National Māori and Pasifika Officer, National Operations Officer, National People Officer and National Relations Officer. The National Executive meets virtually around three times a month. Additionally, they have an Appointments Committee; Budget Committee; Policy Committee, Te Kawekawe (Māori and Pasifika Advisory Committee); and Welfare Committee who meet regularly.

Regional Councils 
UN Youth has four Regional Councils who oversee the regions of Auckland (Tāmaki Makaurau), Canterbury (Waitaha), Otago (Otakou) and Wellington (Poneke). Their primary obligation is running regional events in their wider region and they are accountable to the Board of Directors. 

Each Regional Council is led by a Regional President.

See also
 United Nations Youth Australia
 United Nations Association
 Model United Nations

References

External links
 Official website

Youth organisations based in New Zealand
World Federation of United Nations Associations